Philippine Sea may have the following meanings:

Philippine Sea, part of the western Pacific Ocean bordered by the Philippines, Taiwan, Japan, the Marianas, and Palau
Battle of the Philippine Sea, a World War II naval battle between Japan and the United States
Two ships of the United States Navy have been named USS Philippine Sea, after the Battle of the Philippine Sea in World War II
The first USS Philippine Sea (CV-47), an aircraft carrier in service from 1946 to 1958, and a participant in the Korean War
The second USS Philippine Sea (CG-58), a guided missile cruiser commissioned in 1989 and on active service as of 2020

See also
 West Philippine Sea, an alternative name for a portion of the South China Sea